The 1901–02 British Home Championship was an international football tournament between the British Home Nations which was meant to herald the arrival of the full professional game of football as both England and Scotland fielded fully professional teams for the first time. The championship was however dominated and overshadowed by a disaster during the final deciding match between England and Scotland at Ibrox Park, which claimed 25 lives. Six minutes into the game, a section of the wooden West Tribune Stand suddenly collapsed due to heavy rainfall the night before. Over 500 people were injured as the stadium was packed to its 68,000 capacity for the match. Although play was stopped in the immediate aftermath of the disaster as players, police and stewards rushed to aid the injured, it was later continued. The continued match finished 1–1 despite the players' reluctance and repeated pauses to allow police and injured spectators to cross the pitch. After the match the Scottish and English Football Associations decided to void the result, and the match was replayed at Villa Park. All proceeds from the replay were contributed to the Disaster Fund set up to aid victims of the accident.

Ireland kicked off the tournament in fine style, beating Wales 3–0 in Cardiff with a good performance. Their luck didn't hold out in their second game however, thumped 5–1 by an impressive Scottish side in Greenock. Scotland continued their run of good form against Wales, with another 5–1 victory, setting them up as tournament favourites going into the final games. England had played poorly in their opening matches, drawing 0–0 with Wales and scrambling a 1–0 victory over the Irish. The final match up was marred by tragedy and the game was eventually relocated to England due to the turmoil in the Scottish football community as a result of the disaster. The match was fiercely fought and ended with a 2–2 draw, sharing the points but giving the championship to the Scots.

Table

Results

The match between Scotland and England was canceled after being suspended at 51' (1-1) due to the 1902 Ibrox disaster. Days later the match was repeated (2-2).

Winning squad

Notes

References

1902 in British sport
Brit
Brit
1901
Brit
Brit